Bryce Beeston (born 30 September 1947) is a New Zealand cyclist. He competed in the individual road race at the 1968 Summer Olympics.

References

External links
 

1947 births
Living people
New Zealand male cyclists
Olympic cyclists of New Zealand
Cyclists at the 1968 Summer Olympics
Sportspeople from Whangārei
Cyclists at the 1970 British Commonwealth Games
Commonwealth Games competitors for New Zealand
20th-century New Zealand people